Legislative Sejm can refer to the two Polish Sejms known in Polish as Sejm Ustawodawczy:
 Legislative Sejm (Second Polish Republic), 1919–1922
 Legislative Sejm (1947–1952)